Eugenio Guadalupe Govea Arcos (born 22 March 1966) is a Mexican politician affiliated with the Convergence. As of 2013 he served as Senator of the LX and LXI Legislatures of the Mexican Congress representing San Luis Potosí.

References

1966 births
Living people
People from San Luis Potosí
Members of the Senate of the Republic (Mexico)
Citizens' Movement (Mexico) politicians
21st-century Mexican politicians